Paschalis may refer to:

 Mysterii Paschalis, a 1969 motu proprio published by Pope Paul VI
 Mericella paschalis, a species of sea snail
 Stratis Paschalis (born 1958), Greek poet, novelist and translator

See also
 Pascal (disambiguation)
 Paschal (disambiguation)
 Pasquale (disambiguation)
 Pasqual (disambiguation)
 Pascual (disambiguation)
 Pascoe
 Pasco (disambiguation)